Route 63 may refer to:

Route 63 (MTA Maryland), a defunct bus route in Baltimore, Maryland and its suburbs
London Buses route 63
Route 63 (WMATA), a bus route in Washington, D.C.

See also
List of highways numbered 63

63